The Windsor School is a private junior and senior high school located in Flushing, Queens, enrolling students in grades 7–12.  It is a day school for local and international students.

The school certified by the Student and Exchange Visitor Program (SEVP) to issue the Form I-20, which gives a student the opportunity to apply for a F-1 Visa. It is accredited by the Middle States Association of Colleges and Secondary Schools and is a member of the New York State Association of Independent Schools (NYSAIS) and NY Parents League.

The academic program includes Advanced Placement (AP) classes, many electives in English and Social Sciences, and the opportunity for students to join the school's top-ranked New York Mathematics League math team.  The art department offers students the opportunity to take Advanced Placement (AP) Studio Art: Drawing or 2-D Design, in addition to creative crafts and experimental art electives.

The athletics department includes soccer, tennis, basketball, and track and field.  The school's athletes compete in the Metro League, which comprises private schools throughout the New York City metropolitan area.

References

Preparatory schools in New York City
Private high schools in Queens, New York
Private middle schools in Queens, New York
1969 establishments in New York City